The Diocese of Yongnian/Weixian is a Latin Church ecclesiastical territory or diocese located in the city of Yongnian, China. It is a suffragan diocese in the ecclesiastical province of the metropolitan Archdiocese of Beijing.

The diocese is also named Diocese of Handan/Yongnian.

History
The Catholic Church in Handan was established as an apostolic prefecture on May 24, 1929, by Pope Pius XI. The diocesan territory covered the counties of Yongnian, Jize, Zhuzhou, Weixian, Chengan, Cixian, Handan, Qinghe, Guangping, Feixiang with the cathedral located at Zhaozhuang of Weixian. It became an apostolic vicariate on March 6, 1933 and was made a diocese on April 11, 1946.

 May 24, 1929: Established as the Apostolic Prefecture of Yongnian 永年 from the Apostolic Vicariate of Xianxian 獻縣
 March 6, 1933: Promoted as Apostolic Vicariate of Yongnian 永年
 April 11, 1946: Promoted as Diocese of Yongnian 永年

The Diocese plans to build a cathedral in Handan, with a total cost of 3.5 million yuan. The construction of the church was approved by the local government in 2013. The church will be designed by the School of Architecture of the Hebei University of Engineering and will be located in the Wulipu Village in the Sucao Township

Handan/Yongnian is the fastest-growing diocese in Mainland China after the Diocese of Xingtai.

Leadership
 Bishops of Yongnian 永年
  Coadjutor bishop Joseph Sun Jigen (2011)
 Bishop Joseph Cui Shou-xun (Tsui Shou-hsün) (April 11, 1946 – 1953)
 Vicars Apostolic of Yongnian 永年 (Roman Rite)
 Bishop Joseph Cui Shou-xun (Tsui Shou-hsün) (March 6, 1933 – April 11, 1946)
 Prefects Apostolic of Yongnian 永年 (Roman Rite)
 Fr. Joseph Cui Shou-xun (Tsui Shou-hsün) (later Bishop) (June 1, 1929 – March 6, 1933)

There are 85 priests in the diocese.

References

 邯郸教区
 Giga-Catholic Information
 Catholic Hierarchy

Roman Catholic dioceses in China
Christian organizations established in 1929
Roman Catholic dioceses and prelatures established in the 20th century
Christianity in Hebei
1929 establishments in China